Arabov is a Slavic masculine surname, its feminine counterpart is Arabova. It may refer to
Jacob Arabo (born Arabov), Bukharian-American jeweler
Nikolay Arabov (born 1953), Bulgarian football player 
Yekaterina Arabova (born 1983), Sport shooter from Turkmenistan
Yuri Arabov (born 1954), Russian screenwriter, writer, poet and educator